San Marino, following its début at the 1960 Summer Olympics, has competed in 15 Summer Olympics, and 10 Winter Olympics. 

San Marino has won three medals at the Olympics, two in shooting and one in wrestling, with all three thus far coming at Tokyo 2020. Its most successful athlete is Alessandra Perilli, who, having finished 4th in the Women's Trap final at London 2012, went on to win two medals at Tokyo 2020, first a bronze in the Women's Trap  and two days later, silver with Gian Marco Berti in the Mixed Trap Team final.

With a population of 33,600, San Marino is, as of Tokyo 2020, the smallest country by population to have won an Olympic medal, narrowly edging out previous smallest nations Bermuda (Summer Olympics) and Liechtenstein (Winter Olympics).

Medal tables

Medals by Summer Games

Medals by Winter Games

Medals by Summer sport

List of Olympic medalists

Olympic participants

Summer Olympics

Winter Olympics

See also
 List of flag bearers for San Marino at the Olympics
 San Marino at the Paralympics

References

External links